Cobán Airport is an airport serving Cobán, the capital of the Alta Verapaz Department of Guatemala.

The airport is at the western edge of the city. There is mountainous terrain north through southwest, and distant rising terrain south. An overrun to the south will descend into a shallow ravine.

See also
 Transport in Guatemala
 List of airports in Guatemala

References

External links 
 
 
 OpenStreetMap - Cobán
 FallingRain - Cobán Airport

Airports in Guatemala
Alta Verapaz Department
Buildings and structures in Cobán